The Cassock Spring, also called Dugu Spring or Yinquan Spring, is a culturally significant artesian karst spring on the grounds of the Lingyan Temple in the city of Jinan, Shandong Province, China. The name Cassock Spring refers to a piece of cast iron that is positioned at the edge of the spring pool and resembles a cassock. The Cassock Spring is listed among the "seventy-two famous springs", a list of springs in Jinan that has been kept and updated since the times of the Jin, Ming, and Qing Dynasties.

See also
List of sites in Jinan

References

Bodies of water of Shandong
Springs of China